Ramón Castroviejo Briones (1904–1987) was a Spanish and American eye surgeon remembered for his achievements in corneal transplantation.

Biography
Born in Logroño, Spain he received his medical education at the University of Madrid. He graduated in 1927 and worked at the Chicago Eye, Ear, Nose and Throat Hospital and the Mayo Clinic before, in 1931, he came to Columbia Presbyterian Medical Center in New York. He became the director of Ophthalmology at St. Vincent's Hospital before he opened his own hospital when he bought the Hammond House. After his retirement he moved to Madrid where he died.

Achievements
While not being the first to successfully graft human cornea, he improved the technique of the operation in the 1930s and 1940s, prompting the worldwide adoption of corneal transplantation as a standard way to deal with severe corneal pathology. His keratoplasty technique remained standard until more efficient suture materials became available.

Castroviejo designed the Castroviejo needle holder, an instrument used in eye, dental and other forms of microsurgery.

See also
 Vladimir Filatov - a Soviet contemporary of Castroviejo that was also a pioneer in corneal transplantation.

Books, articles by Castroviejo 
 Atlas of Keratectomy and Keratoplasty. Ramon Castroviejo. 446 pages. Published by W.B. SAUNDERS COMPANY in 1966.

References

External links
 Cornea Society - previously known as Castroviejo Cornea Society.
 Curriculum Vitae at the Madrid University website
 The 10 most influential ophthalmologists in the 20th century, squintmaster.com

1904 births
1987 deaths
Spanish ophthalmologists
Spanish emigrants to the United States
American military doctors
New York University faculty